John Paul Fresolo (born October 11, 1964) is an American politician who served in the Massachusetts House of Representatives from 1999 to 2013. He is a Worcester resident and a member of the Democratic Party.

See also
 Massachusetts House of Representatives' 16th Worcester district

References

1964 births
Living people
Democratic Party members of the Massachusetts House of Representatives
Politicians from Worcester, Massachusetts
American people of Italian descent